Kazurō, Kazuro or Kazurou (written: 和郎) is a masculine Japanese given name. Notable people with the name include:

 (born 1972), Japanese manga artist
Kazuro Kikuchi, Japanese electrical engineering professor
 (1955–2012), Japanese video game designer
 (born 1955), Japanese astronomer

Japanese masculine given names